Robert Mignat (29 June 1921 – 16 August 2007) was a French racing cyclist. He rode in the 1948 Tour de France.

References

External links

1921 births
2007 deaths
French male cyclists
Cyclists from Paris